The 2019–20 Belgian Second Amateur Division was the fourth season of the division in its current format, placed at the fourth-tier of football in Belgium. Mid-March all matches were temporarily postponed due to the COVID-19 pandemic in Belgium, only to be canceled permanently two weeks later, with the standing as of March 12 counting as final. As a result, Knokke, Tienen and Francs Borains were crowned champions in their respective league and were each promoted to the 2020–21 Belgian First Amateur Division.

The division consists of three separate leagues, each containing 16 teams. Leagues A and B consist of teams with a license from the Voetbalfederatie Vlaanderen (VFV, the Flemish/Dutch speaking wing of the Belgian FA), while league C contains teams with a license from the Association des Clubs Francophones de Football (ACFF, the French-speaking wing of the RBFA). The champions from each of the three leagues will promote to the 2020–21 Belgian First Amateur Division. The fixtures were announced in early July 2019.

Team changes

In
 ASV Geel, Eendracht Aalst and Knokke after finishing in the relegation zone in the 2018–19 Belgian First Amateur Division.
 Oudenaarde was also relegated from the 2018–19 Belgian First Amateur Division after losing the Second Amateur Division promotion play-offs, where the team failed to regain its place in the First Amateur Division.
 Merelbeke was promoted after winning the 2018–19 Belgian Third Amateur Division A.
 Tienen was promoted after winning the 2018–19 Belgian Third Amateur Division B.
 Namur Fosses was promoted after winning the 2018–19 Belgian Third Amateur Division C.
 Stockay-Warfusée was promoted after winning the 2018–19 Belgian Third Amateur Division D.
 Pepingen-Halle and Zwevezele were promoted as winners of the Third Amateur Division promotion play-offs VFV.
 Onhaye and Verlaine were promoted as winners of the Third Amateur Division promotion play-offs ACFF.
 Givry was also promoted for finishing third in the Third Amateur Division promotion play-offs ACFF as an extra ACFF spot opened up due to the promotion of Visé to the 2019–20 Belgian First Amateur Division.

Out
 Sint-Eloois-Winkel was promoted after winning the 2018–19 Belgian Second Amateur Division A.
 Patro Eisden Maasmechelen was promoted after winning the 2018–19 Belgian Second Amateur Division B.
 La Louvière Centre was promoted after winning the 2018–19 Belgian Second Amateur Division C.
 Visé was promoted after winning the Promotion play-offs.
 Overijse, Brakel, Turnhout, Heur-Tongeren, Wallonia Walhain and Ciney were all relegated after finishing in the relegation positions the previous season.
 Olympic Charleroi was relegated as well, but the club merged with Châtelet playing in the 2018–19 Belgian First Amateur Division to become Olympic Charleroi CF. As such the club will play in the 2019–20 Belgian First Amateur Division.
 City Pirates was relegated after losing the Relegation play-offs.
 Despite winning the relegation play-offs, Eppegem was also relegated due to the promotion of ACFF team Visé, forcing an extra VFV team to be relegated.

Belgian Second Amateur Division A

League table

Belgian Second Amateur Division B

League table

Belgian Second Amateur Division C

League table

References

Belgian Second Amateur Division
Bel
4
Belgium